Anatoliy Vladimirovich Kotenyov (born 1958) is a Russian/Belarusian actor. He began his screen career in 1985 and appeared in more than 120 Soviet, Russian, Belarusian and Ukrainian movies and TV series. probably the most important movie, he has played is As Far as My Feet Will Carry Me.

Biography
He was born on 25 September 1958 in Sukhumi, Abkhaz ASSR, Georgian SSR, Soviet Union. He is married to Svetlana Borovskaya since 1989 and he has two children.

Selected filmography

 Sailor Zheleznyak  (1985) as Anatoli Zhelezniakov – Vitaliy Dudin
 Secret Fairway (1986-1987) as Shubin – Vadim Kostromenko
 Whose Are You, Old People? (1988) as Bukin – Iosif Kheifits
 Deja Vu (1990) as Vladimir Mayakovsky – Juliusz Machulski
 Sheriff's Star (1992) as Frank Angeli – Nikolai Litus
  Istanbul Transit  (1993) as Viktor Zvyagin – Grigori Kokhan
 The Fourth Planet (1995) as Belyaev ((voiced by Valery Kukhareshin) – Dmitry Astrakhan
 From Hell to Hell (1997) as  episode – Dmitry Astrakhan
 Deserter (1997) as Igor Skvortsov – Yuriy Muzyka
 Contract with Death (1998) as general – Dmitry Astrakhan
 As Far as My Feet Will Carry Me (2001) as Kamenev – Hardy Martins
 Bless the Woman (2003) as colonel – Stanislav Govorukhin
 The Last Confession (2006) as Rykin – Sergei Lyalin
 The Apocalypse Code (2006) as FSB General – Vadim Shmelyov
 Break-through (2006) as Alexander Kazakov – Vitaliy Lukin
 Metro (2013) as Mayor of Moscow – Anton Megerdichev
 Voronin's Family (2015) as Pavel Galanov (series 341) –  Alexander Zhigalkin
 The Age of Pioneers (2017) as Nikolai Kamanin –  Dmitry Kiselyov
 The Humorist (2019) as general Yasenev – Mikhail Idov
 The Crown (2022) as Boris Yeltsin – Christian Schwochow

References

1958 births
Living people
People from Sukhumi
Moscow Art Theatre School alumni
Soviet male film actors
Soviet male television actors
Russian male film actors
Russian male television actors
Belarusian  male film actors
Belarusian  male television actors
Recipients of the Order of Francysk Skaryna